Ascanius (Ancient Greek:  Ἀσκάνιος) was a legendary king of Alba Longa (1176-1138 BC) and is the son of the Trojan hero Aeneas and Creusa, daughter of Priam. He is a character in Roman mythology, and has a divine lineage, being the son of Aeneas, who is the son of the goddess Venus and the hero Anchises, a relative of the king Priam; thus Ascanius has divine ascendents by both parents, being descendants of god Jupiter and Dardanus. He is also an ancestor of Romulus, Remus and the Gens Julia. Together with his father, he is a major character in Virgil's Aeneid, and he is depicted as one of the founders of the Roman race.

Mythology
In Greek and Roman mythology, Ascanius was the son of the Trojan prince Aeneas and Creusa, daughter of Priam. After the Trojan War, as the city burned, Aeneas escaped to Latium in Italy, taking his father Anchises and his child Ascanius with him, though Creusa died during the escape.

According to Dionysius of Halicarnassus, Ascanius' original name was Euryleon and this name was changed to Ascanius after his flight from Troy. According to Virgil, Ascanius was also called Iulus or Julus. The Gens Julia, or the Julians, the clan to which Julius Caesar belonged, claimed to have been descended from Ascanius/Iulus, his father Aeneas, and, ultimately, the goddess Venus, the mother of Aeneas in myth, his father being the mortal Anchises.

According to Dionysius of Halicarnassus, however, Julus was a son of Ascanius who disputed the succession of the kingdom of Alba Longa with Silvius, upon the death of Ascanius.

According to another legend mentioned by Livy, Ascanius may have been the son of Aeneas and Lavinia and thus born in Latium, not Troy. Ascanius later fought in the Italian Wars along with his father Aeneas.

After the death of Aeneas, Ascanius became king of Lavinium and an Etruscan king named Mezentius took advantage of the occasion to besiege the city. Mezentius succeeded in making the city surrender and agree to pay a yearly tribute. Upon his retirement, Ascanius fell upon him and his army unaware and entirely defeated Mezentius and killed his son Lausus. Mezentius was forced to agree to pay a yearly tribute.  Subsequent to this, exactly thirty years after the founding of Lavinium, Ascanius founded the city of Alba Longa and became its first king. He left Lavinia in charge of the city of Lavinium. Ascanius was succeeded by Silvius, who was either his younger brother or his son. Ascanius died in the 28th year of his reign.

Aeneid

However, in the Aeneid, Virgil claims that Mezentius fought in the Italian Wars at the time Aeneas was alive. In the Aeneid, it is Aeneas who kills Lausus after harming Mezentius, who escaped while his son faced the Trojan king. When the news about Lausus' death reaches Mezentius, he comes back to face Aeneas, and is killed too. In this account, Ascanius does not participate in these deaths.

Nevertheless, Virgil shows Ascanius' first experience at war. In the Aeneid, Ascanius is a teenager without real war experiences, but while besieged by the Italians, Ascanius launches an arrow against Numanus, the husband of the youngest sister of Turnus. After killing Numanus, Apollo comes and says to Ascanius:

Macte nova virtute, puer:  sic itur ad astra,
dis genite et geniture deos.

This phrase can be translated into English as: "Go forth with new value, boy: thus is the path to the stars; son of gods that will have gods as sons." or "Blessings on your fresh courage, boy, scion of gods and ancestor of gods yet to be, so it is man rises to the stars." In this verse, Virgil makes a clear reference to the offspring of Iulus, from whom Augustus Caesar claimed descent. Therefore, in this verse Virgil refers to the Gens Julia, the family of Augustus and Julius Caesar, who was deified after his death.

The sic itur ad astra become almost proverbial and several mottos use an ad astra phrase. After this episode, Apollo orders to the Trojans to keep Ascanius away from the war.

In this same episode Ascanius, before launching the fatal arrow in Numanus, prays to Jupiter, saying: Jupiter omnipotens, audacibus annue cœptis ("Omnipotent Jupiter, please favour my bold attempt"). The last part of the hexameter became the United States motto annuit coeptis.

The name Iulus was popularised by Virgil in the Aeneid: replacing the Greek name Ascanius with Iulus linked the Julian family of Rome to earlier mythology. The emperor Augustus, who commissioned the work, was a great patron of the arts. As a member of the Julian family, he could claim to have four major Olympian gods in his family tree: (Jupiter, Juno, Venus and Mars), so he encouraged his many poets to emphasize his supposed descent from Aeneas.

See also
Augustan literature
Gens Julia
Kingdom of Rome
The Golden Bough (mythology)

Notes

References
 Livy, Ab urbe condita Book 1.
 Virgil, Aeneid, Book IX.

External links

The Aeneid in Latin 
The Aeneid in English

Characters in Roman mythology
Characters in the Aeneid
Kings of Alba Longa
Kings in Greek mythology